Small firms' Merit Award for Research and Technology (SMART)  was a discretionary business grant scheme run by the UK Department of Trade and Industry for a number of years in the 1980s and 1990s. The award was made to companies winning an annual competition (organised regionally) based on a judgement of the technical and market viability of research or technology development proposals; in essence the award represented seed-corn funding for innovative developments that had some market potential.

The scheme was generally considered to be very successful. In 2002 the scheme was changed from a competition to an award to any applicant who met minimum criteria. This led to several regions exhausting their budget. In 2005 the scheme was shut down and replaced with the Grant for Research and Development which was again a regional competition.

Economic history of the United Kingdom